Eric of Saxe-Lauenburg may refer to:

 Eric I, Duke of Saxe-Lauenburg (1280–1360),
 Eric II, Duke of Saxe-Lauenburg (1318–1368)
 Eric III, Duke of Saxe-Lauenburg (died 1401)
 Eric IV, Duke of Saxe-Lauenburg (1354–1411)
 Eric V, Duke of Saxe-Lauenburg (died 1436)
 Eric of Saxe-Lauenburg (prince-bishop) (1472–1522)